Jaadugar is a 1989 Indian Hindi-language fantasy comedy film directed and produced by Prakash Mehra starring Amitabh Bachchan, Jaya Prada, Aditya Pancholi, Amrita Singh, Amrish Puri and Pran in the lead roles. Mehra and Bachchan collaborated for the eighth and final time on this movie.

The movie was poorly received by critics and audiences and was a box office flop. Amrish Puri's charisma as the godman made him a popular choice for negative roles with other directors.

Plot

Returned American NRI Shankar Narayan is baffled to witness his former businessman and jailbird dad posing as a soothsayer by the name of Mahaprabhu Janak Sagar Jagat Narayan, in a small town called Dharampur. He learns that his father has learned a few magician's tricks from a fellow inmate, and is able to fool the entire township with his "divine" powers. Shankar enlists the assistance of noted magician Goga, and brings him to Dharampur. Goga challenges the Mahaprabhu; he is able to dethrone him, ousts him from his temple, and takes over. His task over, Shankar asks Goga to leave; but power-hungry Goga, who now calls himself Gogeshwar, refuses to let go of his new-found position.

Actually Goga is not as power-hungry as he seems to be. Mahaprabhu, however, refuses to give up and uses all deceitful methods to expose the fact that Goga is just a mortal, and it is he who is actually divine. He tries to poison the 'Prasad' that Goga gives to his 'followers' but they all escape. In the end, Goga completely exposes 'Mahaprabhu' in front of the whole public along with the fact that he himself is a common man who posed as a 'Divine' man just to match and teach 'Mahaprabhu'. He then returns to his best role – being the people's magician.

Cast
Amitabh Bachchan as Goga / Gogeshwar 
Jaya Prada as Meena 
Aditya Pancholi as Shankar Narayan
Amrita Singh as Mona
Raza Murad as Rajbharti 
Amrish Puri as Mahaprabhu Jagatsagar Chintamani
Pran as Gajendra
Alka Nupur as Amina
Harbans Darshan M. Arora as Police Inspector (as Harbans Darshan) 
Vikas Anand as Kanchan
Bharat Bhushan as Gyaneshwar 
Ram Sethi as Pyarelal
Bob Christo as Bob 
Leena Das as Flory 
C. S. Dubey as Pujari 
K. S. Ramesh as himself (Magician)
Gorilla as Bajrangi 
Satyendra Kapoor as Police Commissioner 
Johnny Lever as Nilkanth 
Ram Mohan as M.L.A. 
Mukri as Nathulal 
Babbanlal Yadav as Gambler

Soundtrack

The Soundtrack was composed by Kalyanji Anandji. The lyrics were written by Anjaan, Prakash Mehra and Javed Akhtar.

References

External links

Jaadugar at Gaana
Jaadugar at Twitter
Jaadugar at Bollywood Hungama

1989 films
1980s Hindi-language films
Films directed by Prakash Mehra
Films scored by Kalyanji Anandji